Lajos Maszlay (2 October 1903 – 1 December 1979) was a Hungarian fencer. He won a bronze medal at the 1948 Summer Olympics and another at the 1952 Summer Olympics.

References

External links
 

1903 births
1979 deaths
Hungarian male foil fencers
Olympic fencers of Hungary
Fencers at the 1936 Summer Olympics
Fencers at the 1948 Summer Olympics
Fencers at the 1952 Summer Olympics
Olympic bronze medalists for Hungary
Martial artists from Budapest
Olympic medalists in fencing
Medalists at the 1948 Summer Olympics
Medalists at the 1952 Summer Olympics
20th-century Hungarian people